Cummascach mac Flainn (died 757) was a king of the Uí Failge, a Laigin people of County Offaly. He was one of the many sons of Fland Dá Chongal, a previous king. He ruled from 755 to 757. He was the first of Fland's sons by Érenach, daughter of Murchad Midi (died 715) of Uisnech to hold the throne.

Not mentioned in the Annals of Ulster, the Annals of Tigernach record that he was slain in 757 by Máel Dúin mac Áedo (died 786), King of Munster.

Notes

See also
 Kings of Ui Failghe

References

 Mac Niocaill, Gearoid (1972), Ireland before the Vikings, Dublin: Gill and Macmillan

External links
CELT: Corpus of Electronic Texts at University College Cork

757 deaths
People from County Offaly
8th-century Irish monarchs
Year of birth unknown